Barrier Air is a New Zealand airline that was established in 1983 by Jim Bergman as Great Barrier Airlines. The head office is located at the Domestic Terminal at Auckland Airport in Mangere, with additional offices in the terminal buildings at Great Barrier Aerodrome, Kaitaia Airport and North Shore Aerodrome.

History
The airline's initial fleet was one Cessna 172, one Cessna 206 and one vintage three-engine de Havilland Australia DHA-3 Drover. Bergman flew the first scheduled service to Great Barrier Island on 2 December 1983, departing from Ardmore Airport, three nautical miles southeast of Manurewa in Auckland. The company initially operated three flights a day from Ardmore to Auckland International and on to Great Barrier Aerodrome at Claris. In July 1984 the airline started flights to Okiwi Airfield on Great Barrier Island as well. The first Britten Norman Islander was introduced in December 1984.

The first flights to Whangarei from its Auckland base began in August 1987. The airline briefly served Waiheke island, from August 1994 to April 1995. They also purchased a subsidiary company, Air Coromandel, in 1995, which had sole commercial rights to Whitianga. In November 1996 Rotorua (served via Tauranga) and Paihia were added to the network. The Rotorua flight was extended to Taupo in November 1998. A new aircraft type was added, the Britten Norman Trislander starting services on 24 December 2002. Since then three other Trislanders have served in the fleet.
In early 2015, coinciding with a change in management, and the purchase of an ex-Bering Air Cessna Grand Caravan, the name of the airline was changed from Great Barrier Airlines to Barrier Air. The airline now operates a fleet of Grand Caravans – other aircraft models have been retired.

For more than two decades, it was in a long-running commercial battle with its main local competitor Fly My Sky, until the latter went into liquidation in 2021. Fly My Sky descended from the Great Barrier division of Mountain Air, and operated at various times under the names Great Barrier Xpress and Great Barrier Air, the latter name being subsequently forbidden by a legal injunction as it was too similar to Great Barrier Airlines, the name of which is now Barrier Air. The competition between the two airlines is considered one of the main reasons for the relatively low flight prices, which as of January 2008 remained almost exactly at 1998 prices, despite a trebling of aviation fuel prices in the nine years of competition between the two airlines.

Barrier Air returned to Whitianga on 15 December 2021 using Cessna Grand Caravan aircraft. On 22 December Barrier Air announced plans to purchase a fifth Cessna Grand Caravan and look at launching new routes such as Auckland to Tauranga, following the success of the new Whitianga to Auckland route.. A year later a new air service between Tauranga and Great Barrier Island was launched.

Current destinations
As of December 2022, Barrier Air operate the following routes:

From Auckland
Claris - Great Barrier Island - Great Barrier Aerodrome
Kaitaia - Kaitaia Airport
Whitianga - Whitianga Aerodrome

From Claris - Great Barrier Island (Great Barrier Aerodrome)
Auckland - Auckland Airport
North Shore - North Shore Aerodrome
Tauranga - Tauranga Airport

From Kaitaia
Auckland - Auckland Airport

From Whitianga
Auckland - Auckland Airport

From Tauranga
Claris - Great Barrier Island - Great Barrier Aerodrome

Former destinations

 Hamilton - Hamilton Airport
 Waiheke Island - Waiheke Island Aerodrome
 Taupo - Taupo Airport
 Rotorua - Rotorua Airport
 Whangarei - Whangarei Airport
 Paihia

Fleet 

, Barrier Air's fleet consists of the following aircraft:

Barrier Air (and its predecessor Great Barrier Airlines) formerly operated the following aircraft:

References

External links 

Official website

Airlines of New Zealand
Airlines established in 1983
Transport in Auckland
Companies based in Auckland
New Zealand companies established in 1983